Cartan is a small lunar impact crater near the eastern edge of the Moon. It lies just to the west of the larger Apollonius. The rim is circular with a tiny crater along the eastern side. The interior floor is about half the diameter of the crater. A smaller crater attached to the southern rim is also attached to the north rim of Apollonius H, forming a short crater chain.

It was named after the French mathematician Élie Cartan in 1976. Before, it was designated Apollonius D.

References

 
 
 
 
 
 
 
 
 
 
 

Impact craters on the Moon